Hannah Soar (born June 4, 1999) is an American freestyle skier who competes internationally.

She competed in the FIS Freestyle Ski and Snowboarding World Championships 2021, where she placed tenth in women's ski moguls.

She competed at the 2022 Winter Olympics.

References

1999 births
Living people
American female freestyle skiers
21st-century American women
Freestyle skiers at the 2022 Winter Olympics
Olympic freestyle skiers of the United States